Wandong  is a town in Victoria, Australia. The main centre nearest Wandong is Kilmore.

History

The traditional owners of Wandong are the Taungurung people, a part of the Kulin nation that inhabited a large portion of central Victoria including Port Phillip Bay and its surrounds. Wandong itself is an Aboriginal word meaning "Spirit".

The first Europeans to reach Wandong were Hamilton Hume and Captain William Hilton Hovell who travelled through the centre of the future town of Wandong on the 13th December, 1824. 
The explorers proceeded 1260 metres South of Arkell’s Lane, Wandong and crossed the Dividing Range at the low peak there that they named Hume’s Pass. They then moved South along Eastern Ridge, Hidden Valley, and downhill to the Merri Creek, Wallan East near Kelby Lane. 

That made Wandong the second township site in Victorian history to be traversed by European explorers. Broadford was the first: Hume and Hovell had passed through it on the same morning. 

This exact route has been proven by decoding the map drawn by Hamilton Hume which conforms exactly to the original journal of William Hovell. Hamilton Hume in 1867 corrected his own earlier error that the party crossed the Dividing Range at Big Hill, Bylands.

Wandong was a pastoral region from at least 1843. 

By 1876 a small settlement had arisen and a post office gazetted to Mr. F. G. Arkell.

From 1880 Wandong became a major sawmilling and processing town and region.

The town is now a major transport hub with the Hume Highway and the Albury-Wodonga and Shepparton railway lines passing through it. It has its own railway station.

The local school was originally situated to the south of Wandong/Heathcote Junction and was known as Lightwood Flat Common School when it opened in 1871. The school was transferred to its current site in Wandong in 1882, and is currently known as Wandong Primary School. The school was damaged slightly in the Black Saturday bushfires.

The town hosts the Wandong Country Music Festival.

References

External links

Towns in Victoria (Australia)
Shire of Mitchell
Hume Highway